Huajuapan District is located in the north of the Mixteca Region of the State of Oaxaca, Mexico. The principal city is Huajuapan de León.

Municipalities

The district includes the following municipalities:
 
Asunción Cuyotepeji
Cosoltepec
Fresnillo de Trujano
Huajuapan de León
Mariscala de Juárez
San Andrés Dinicuiti
San Jerónimo Silacayoapilla
San Jorge Nuchita
San José Ayuquila
San Juan Bautista Suchitepec
San Marcos Arteaga
San Martín Zacatepec
San Miguel Amatitlan
San Pedro y San Pablo Tequixtepec
San Simón Zahuatlan
Santa Catarina Zapoquila
Santa Cruz Tacache de Mina
Santa María Camotlán
Santiago Ayuquililla
Santiago Cacaloxtepec
Santiago Chazumba
Santiago Huajolotitlán
Santiago Miltepec
Santo Domingo Tonalá
Santo Domingo Yodohino
Santos Reyes Yucuná
Tezoatlán de Segura y Luna
Zapotitlán Palmas

See also
Municipalities of Oaxaca

References

Districts of Oaxaca
Mixteca Region